Mehdi is a common Arabic masculine given name, meaning "rightly guided". People having the name Mehdi are in general originating from Iran mostly and sometimes India, Bangladesh, Pakistan, Afghanistan, Iraq, Azerbaijan, France, Morocco, Algeria, Saudi Arabia, Tunisia, United States of America.

This name is a variation of the name Mahdi which has an Arabic origin. Other, less common, variations are Medi, Mehti, Meyti.

People with the given name

Arts and entertainment
 DJ Mehdi (1977–2011), French hip hop and house producer
 Mehdi Bagheri (born 1980), Iranian kamancheh player and composer
 Mehdi Bahmad, Moroccan-born Canadian singer, songwriter, producer, director, and visual artist
 Mehdi Bajestani (born 1974), Iranian actor
 Mehdi Bozorgmehr, Iranian musician and composer
 Mehdi Charef, French-Algerian film director and screenwriter
 Mehdi Dehbi (born 1985), Belgian actor and theatre director
 Mehdi Favéris-Essadi, French-Tunisian hip hop and electro producer, better known as DJ Mehdi
 Mehdi Forough (1911–2008), Iranian scholar, author, dramatist, writer on dramatic arts and culture, translator
 Mehdi Ghadyanloo (born 1981), Iranian artist, painter, and muralist
 Mehdi Halıcı (1927-2008), a Turkish writer of Kurdish origin who wrote several novels and books about Kurdish and Turkish culture and history. Also widely known as Cemşid Bender, a pseudonym he used for books and articles on Kurdish culture and history
 Mehdi Hassan, Pakistani ghazal singer
 Mehdi Hosseini (born 1979), Persian composer of contemporary classical music
 Mehdi Khalaji (born 1973), Iranian-American writer, scholar of Islamic studies, political analyst
 Mehdi Pakdel (born 1980), Iranian actor
 Mehdi Mahdloo, Italian actor, model and writer
 Mehdi Mousavi (born 1976), Iranian poet
 Mehdi Norowzian, Iranian-British film director
 Mehdi Rajabian, Iranian musician
 Mehdi Sahabi (1944–2009), Iranian translator, painter and writer
 Mehdi Saki (born 1974), Iranian actor, composer and singer

Politics
 Mehdi Abrishamchi, member of the People's Mujahedin of Iran (MEK) described as "the right hand man of Massoud Rajavi", the group's leader
 Mehdi Azar (1901–1994), Iranian physician and politician
 Mehdi Bazargan, Prime Minister of Iran in 1979
 Mehdi Ben Barka (1920 – disappeared 29 October 1965), Moroccan politician, head of the left-wing National Union of Popular Forces (UNPF) and secretary of the Tricontinental Conference
 Mehdi Frashëri (1872–1963), Albanian intellectual and politician. Served as Prime Minister of Albania in the 1930s 
 Mehdi Hashemi, Iranian cleric and senior official 
 Mehdi Huseynzade (1918–1944), Azerbaijani guerrilla and scout during World War II
 Mehdi Jomaa (born 1962), Tunisian engineer and acting Prime Minister of Tunisia
 Mehdi Karroubi (born 1937), Iranian Shia cleric and reformist politician, former speaker of Parliament in Iran
 Mehdi Noorbakhsh, Iranian academic and political activist affiliated with the Freedom Movement of Iran
 Mehdi Tabatabaei (1936—2018), Iranian Shia cleric and Seyyed, conservative politician who served as member of the Parliament of Iran
 Mehdi Zana (born 1940), Kurdish politician from Turkey

Sports
 Mehdi Abdesmad (born 1991), Canadian-born American football player in the defensive end
 Mehdi Abdi (born 1998), Iranian footballer
 Mehdi Abeid (born 1992), Algerian footballer
 Mehdi Abtahi (born 1963), Iranian footballer 
 Mehdi Baala (born 1978), French, middle-distance runner
 Mehdi Baghdad (born 1985), French mixed martial artist 
 Mehdi Bazargard (born 1979), Iranian volleyball player 
 Mehdi Beneddine (born 1996), French footballer 
 Mehdi Berrahma (born 1992), Moroccan footballer
 Mehdi Bouadla (born 1982), French-Algerian boxer
 Mehdi Boudjemaa (born 1998), French footballer 
 Mehdi Boukassi (born 1996), Algerian footballer
 Mehdi Bourabia (born 1991), Moroccan footballer 
 Mehdi Carcela, or Mehdi François Carcela-González (born 1989), Belgian-born Moroccan footballer
 Mehdi Cerbah (born 1953), Algerian footballer 
 Mehdi Fonounizadeh (born 1962), Iranian footballer 
 Mehdi Ghayedi (born 1998), Iranian footballer
 Mehdi Hafsi, also known as Mehdi Labeyrie (born 1978), French-born Tunisian basketball player
 Mehdi Hasan (cricketer, born 1990), Indian cricketer
 Mehdi Hasheminasab (born 1973), Iranian footballer
 Mehdi Jannatov (born 1992), Azerbaijani footballer
 Mehdi Kadi (born 1994), French footballer
 Mehdi Khalil, Lebanese footballer
 Mehdi Khodabakhshi (born 1991), Iranian-born Serb Taekwondo practitioner.
 Mehdi Lacen, Algerian football player
 Mehdi Lehaire (born 2000), Belgian footballer
 Mehdi Léris (born 1998), French footballer
 Mehdi Leroy, French football player
 Mehdi Mahdavikia, Iranian footballer
 Mehdi Mehdipour (born 1994), Iranian footballer 
 Mehdi Méniri (born 1977), Algerian footballer 
 Mehdi Meriah (born 1979), Tunisian footballer
 Mehdi Momeni, Iranian footballer 
 Mehdi Nafti, Tunisian footballer
 Mehdi Ouertani (born 1990), Tunisian footballer
 Mehdi Pashazadeh (born 1973), Iranian footballer and football coach
 Mehdi Rahmati, Iranian footballer
 Mehdi Salehpour (born 1975), Iranian footballer
 Mehdi Sharifi (born 1992), Iranian footballer
 Mehdi Tahrat (born 1990), Algerian footballer
 Mehdi Taj, Iranian sports executive and administrator 
 Mehdi Taremi (born 1992), Iranian footballer
 Mehdi Terki (born 1991), Algerian footballer 
 Mehdi Tikdari (born 1996), Iranian footballer 
 Mehdi Torabi (born 1994), Iranian footballer
 Mehdi Torkaman (born 1989), Iranian footballer
 Mehdi Yaghoubi (born 1930), Iranian bantamweight freestyle wrestler
 Mehdi Zamani, Iranian sprint athlete
 Mehdi Zatout (born 1983), Algerian-French Muay Thai kickboxer
 Mehdi Zeffane (born 1992), Algerian footballer

Others
 Mehdi Aminrazavi, Iranian scholar of philosophy and mysticism
 Mehdi Ashraphijuo, American mathematician, financial risk manager and writer
 Mehdi Bahadori (born 1933), Iranian professor of mechanical engineering
 Mehdi Bayat (born 1979), French-Iranian businessman, president of the Royal Belgian Football Association
 Mehdi Dibaj (1935–1994), Iranian Christian convert from Shia Islam, pastor and Christian martyr
 Mehdi Golshani, Iranian theoretical physicist
 Mehdi Ghezali, Swedish bank robber
 Mehdi Hasan (born 1979), British-American journalist, broadcaster and author
 Mehdi Hasan (Pakistani journalist) (born 1937), Pakistani journalist
 Mehdi Kazemi, Iranian asylum seeker in the UK
 Mehdi Khalaji, Iranian journalist
 Mehdi Khazali (born 1965), publisher, physician, blogger
 Mehdi Sadaghdar, also known as ElectroBOOM, Iranian-Canadian electrical engineer, YouTuber and comedian
 Mehdi Semsar (1929–2003), Iranian journalist and translator
 Mehdi Shahbazi, American businessman

People with the middle name
 Mohamed Mehdi Hasan (born 1971), Bangladeshi Olympic sprinter
 Mohammad Mehdi Mehdikhani (born 1997), Iranian footballer
 Parvaiz Mehdi Qureshi (born 1943), Pakistani retired four-star air officer and a fighter pilot who served as the eighth Chief of Air Staff (CAS) of the Pakistan Air Force
 Syed Mehdi Shah, first Chief minister of Gilgit-Baltistan.

People with the surname
 Aga Syed Mehdi (1959–2000), Kashmiri Shia leader and social activist
 Amir Mehdi (or Amir Mahdi, and also known as Hunza Mehdi), Pakistani mountaineer
 Anisa Mehdi, Iraqi-Canadian film director and journalist
 Asif Mehdi (born 1966), Pakistani ghazal and playback singer
 Eqbal Mehdi (1946–2008), Pakistani painter 
 Georges Mehdi (1934–2018), Brazilian judoka of French descent
 M. T. Mehdi (1928-1998), Iraqi-American politician and pro-Palestinian activist based in New York
 Parvez Mehdi, born Pervez Akhtar (1947–2005), Pakistani ghazal singer
 Qasim Mehdi, Pakistani molecular biologist and population genetics
 Sahim Saleh Mehdi (born 1967), South Yemen athlete
 Tanvir Mehdi (born 1972), Pakistani cricketer

See also
Mahdi (name)
Medhi (disambiguation)
 Dik El Mehdi, a Lebanese village in the Matn District governorate of Mount Lebanon

References

Arabic masculine given names
Iranian masculine given names
Middle Eastern folklore
Shi'ite surnames